HP Lyrae (HP Lyr) is a variable star in the constellation Lyra, with a visual magnitude varying between 10.2 and 10.8.  It is likely to be an RV Tauri variable, an unstable post-AGB star losing mass before becoming a white dwarf.

Discovery
HP Lyr was first reported to be variable in 1935 by Otto Morgenroth of the Sonneberg Observatory.  The range was given as 9.5 - 10.5 and the variability type only as long-period.  In 1961, it was formally designated as a β Lyr eclipsing variable with two A type supergiants in a close orbit producing smooth continuous variations with alternating minima of different depths.  The period was given as 140.75 days, covering two maxima, and both a deep primary minimum and a slightly less deep secondary minimum.

In 2001 a request was made for observations of HP Lyr and shortly after it was reported that HP Lyr was likely to be an RV Tauri variable rather than an eclipsing binary.  This was confirmed with a more detailed study published in 2002.
  Some authors still maintain that the spectral type and nature of variation mean HP Lyr is more likely to be an eclipsing variable.

Variability
HP Lyr varies by about 0.5 magnitude over a "halfperiod" of 68.4 days.  The formal period, defined for an RV Tauri variable as being from deep minimum to deep minimum is twice that length.  Its spectrum changes from A2-3 at maximum to F2 at the deepest minima.  The radial velocity changes are typical for the pulsations of an RV Tauri variable, but not compatible with a binary orbit.  The spectral type and colour indicated that it was likely to be the hottest known RV Tauri star.

Until 1960, the period of HP Lyr was very consistent at 140.75 days.  Since then it was observed to reduce to below 140 days, probably quite suddenly.  A survey of historic photography including the star showed that the period changed in 1962 or 1963, taking no more than four cycles to reach a new value of 138.66 days.

Properties
It also revealed that the abundances were altered by dust-gas separation in circumstellar material. HP Lyr has been included in a catalog of confirmed post-AGB stars, highly evolved and on its way to becoming a white dwarf. In 2017, the temperature was calculated to be , still one of the hottest known RV Tau variables.

The distance is uncertain, although large. From the radius and effective temperature, the radius is calculated to be .

HP Lyrae is a post-AGB star, one that has completed its evolution along the asymptotic giant branch (AGB) and is now rapidly shedding its outer layers prior to becoming a white dwarf.  During this process it becomes hotter and is crossing the instability strip which causes it to become unstable and pulsate.

Binary
Many RV Tauri stars are found to be in binary systems, and HP Lyrae has an invisible companion in a  orbit.  Its properties are not known, but the mass is estimated to be a little under , leaving open the possibility that it is a white dwarf.

References

External links
 ASAS-3 information
 INTEGRAL-OMC catalogue

Lyra (constellation)
RV Tauri variables
A-type supergiants
F-type supergiants
J19213906+3956080
IRAS catalogue objects
Lyrae, HP
Beta Lyrae variables